Kimberly Anne Keever (born September 22, 1995) is an American soccer defender who last played for the Houston Dash in the NWSL.

Club career

Houston Dash, 2018
Keever was selected by the Houston Dash with the 12th overall pick in the 2018 NWSL College Draft. She officially signed with the club on March 24. Keever was in the starting lineup for Houston's season opener on March 25 against the Chicago Red Stars and scored Houston's only goal in a 1–1 draw. Keever made 11 appearances for the Dash in 2018, she started 9 games and scored 1 goal.

On March 4, 2019, Houston announced that Keever had left the team and returned to the University of Washington.

References

External links
 

1995 births
Living people
National Women's Soccer League players
Houston Dash players
Sportspeople from Manhattan Beach, California
Soccer players from California
American women's soccer players
Washington Huskies women's soccer players
Houston Dash draft picks
Women's association football defenders